Archon bostanchii  is a species of false Apollo butterfly (genus Archon) belonging to the Parnassiinae or snow Apollo subfamily. This recently described papilionid is endemic to Iran.

Footnotes

References
Carbonell, F., 1991. Contribution à la connaissance du genre Archon Hübner 1822: Découverte de zones de sympatrie pour Archon apollinus (Herbst) et Archon apollinaris Staudinger (Lepidoptera: Papilionidae). Linneana Belgica 13: 3-12.
Carbonell, F. and Michel, M., 2007. Une espèce jumelle méconnue du genre Archon Hübner, 1822 (Lepidoptera, Papilionidae). Bulletin de la Société entomologique de France 112 (2), 2007 : 141-150.

Papilionidae
Endemic fauna of Iran
Butterflies of Asia
Butterflies described in 2004